The 39th Hong Kong Film Awards presentation ceremony took place at the Hong Kong Cultural Centre in April 2020, but it was moved online due to preventive measures against COVID-19 and it was livestreamed on May 6, 2020. The awards were handed out on the 17th July 2022 at the  40th Hong Kong Film Awards

Winners and nominees 
Winners are listed first, highlighted in boldface, and indicated with a double dagger .

Films that received multiple awards and nominations

References

External links
 Official website of the Hong Kong Film Awards

2019 film awards
2020 in Hong Kong
April 2019 events in China
2020
Hong